Juan Pablo Avendaño (born 10 May 1982 in Laguna Larga, Córdoba Province) is an Argentine footballer who currently plays for Unión de Santa Fe in the Argentine Primera B Nacional.

Career

Avendaño has played for Talleres de Córdoba, Los Andes, Quilmes, Arsenal de Sarandí and Argentinos Juniors in Argentina. He also had a spell in Mexico with San Luis in 2005.

In July 2010, he joined Unión de Santa Fe.

Honours 
 Kayserispor
Turkish Cup (1): 2008

References

External links
Guardian statistics
Profile at TFF.org

1982 births
Living people
Argentine footballers
Argentine expatriate footballers
Talleres de Córdoba footballers
Club Atlético Los Andes footballers
Quilmes Atlético Club footballers
San Luis F.C. players
Arsenal de Sarandí footballers
Argentinos Juniors footballers
Kayserispor footballers
Expatriate footballers in Turkey
Expatriate footballers in Greece
Expatriate footballers in Mexico
Xanthi F.C. players
Gimnasia y Esgrima de Jujuy footballers
Unión de Santa Fe footballers
Argentine expatriate sportspeople in Turkey
Argentine Primera División players
Liga MX players
Süper Lig players
Super League Greece players
Association football defenders
Sportspeople from Córdoba Province, Argentina